The Englishman's Boy is a novel by Guy Vanderhaeghe, published in 1996 by McClelland and Stewart, which won the Governor General's Award for English-language fiction in 1996 and was nominated for the Giller Prize. It deals with the events of the Cypress Hills Massacre (1873) as told 50 years later to a young screenwriter in Hollywood by the last living survivor.

Television film

On 2 March 2008, The Englishman's Boy premiered as a made-for-television film on CBC with a budget of $11.7 million. The film won six Gemini Awards: Best Dramatic Mini-Series; John N. Smith as director; Nicholas Campbell as leading actor; Katharine Isabelle as supporting actress; Carmen Kotyk, for casting; and Beverley Wowchuk for costumes.

In November 2017 the TV film was released on the Canada Media Fund Encore+ YouTube channel.

Notes

External links
 

1996 Canadian novels
CBC Television original films
Canadian Western (genre) films
Novels by Guy Vanderhaeghe
2008 television films
2008 films
Films directed by John N. Smith
Novels set in Saskatchewan
Novels set in Montana
Canadian novels adapted into films
Fiction set in 1873
McClelland & Stewart books
Governor General's Award-winning fiction books
Gemini and Canadian Screen Award for Best Television Film or Miniseries winners
Canadian drama television films
2000s Canadian films